The 2008–09 Maltese First Division Knock-Out was a knockout tournament for Maltese football clubs playing in the First Division. This year's format differs from the previous 2 years in that the simple knock-out has been replaced by two groups, the top two from each qualifying for the semi-finals. The competition started on 13 September 2008 and finished on 10 May 2009, with the final. The final was contested between the First Division champions Dingli Swallows and St. Patrick. St. Patrick won 2-0.

Group stage

Group 1

Group 2

Knockout phase

Semi-finals

|colspan="3" style="background:#fcc;"|23 May 2009

|}

Final

|colspan="3" style="background:#fcc;"|31 May 2009

|}

See also
 2008–09 Maltese First Division

Maltese First Division knock-out
knock-out